Harold E. "Butch" Woolfolk (born March 1, 1960) is a former American football running back and kick returner who played in college for the University of Michigan (1978–1981) and in the National Football League (NFL) for the New York Giants (1982–1984), Houston Oilers (1985–1986) and Detroit Lions (1987–1988). Woolfolk attended Westfield Senior High School in Westfield, New Jersey. Woolfolk led Michigan in rushing three straight years and set the school record with 3,850 rushing yards while playing for the Wolverines from 1978 to 1981.  As a sophomore in 1979, he was the Big Ten Conference scoring champion, and he went on to become a three-time first-team All-Big Ten selection.  He had his best season as a senior at Michigan, winning the 1981 Big Ten rushing title and falling just 10 yards short of Rob Lytle's single-season rushing yards record.  He was also selected in 1981 as the Most Valuable Player of both the Rose Bowl played January 1, 1981, and the Bluebonnet Bowl played December 31, 1981, as well as the Wolverines' team MVP for the season.

Woolfolk also excelled in track.  He was named an All-American in 1980 and won nine Big Ten track and field championships both as an individual and relay race team member.  He continues to hold the Michigan outdoor 200-meter record.  He was also a member of relay teams that hold numerous U-M and Ferry Field all-time records.

Woolfolk played seven seasons in the NFL.  As a rookie in 1982, he finished third in the NFL in all-purpose yards.  And in 1983, he set an NFL record with 43 rushing attempts in a single game.  He was also fifth in the NFL in receptions in 1985.  Woolfolk was plagued with injuries during his NFL career and was able to play in 16 games only twice—in 1983 and 1985.  In both of those years, he accumulated at least 1,200 yards from scrimmage.  He also had seven 100-yard games—five receiving and two rushing.

High school
Born in Milwaukee, Wisconsin, Woolfolk attended Eastridge High School in Kankakee, Illinois in the 1976–1977 school year.  He moved with his family to Westfield, New Jersey, where he was a multi-sport star at Westfield High School. In 1977, Woolfolk was first-team All-State in American football and set Westfield High School season records with 1,637 yards rushing, 34 touchdowns and 206 points.  He also excelled in track and field, winning the State All-Group and International Prep Invitational 100 meter and 200 meter races.  He also ran the fastest boy's high school times in the nation in 1978.

University of Michigan

All-time Michigan rushing record
He played college football at the University of Michigan (1978–1981) where he led the Wolverines in rushing three straight years, 1979, 1980, and 1981.  He finished his career as the school's all-time leading rusher with 3,861 yards, a record that was eclipsed six years later by Jamie Morris.  Woolfolk still holds the U-M record for the longest and third longest runs from scrimmage, a 92-yard run against Wisconsin in 1979, and an 89–yard gain against Wisconsin in 1981.

Woolfolk now ranks fifth in career rushing at U-M, as shown in the following chart:

253 yards rushing against Michigan State
He began the 1981 season with five consecutive 100-yard games, including a 253-yard effort.  Woolfolk's best game as a Wolverine was the October 10, 1981 contest against Michigan State. The Wolverines beat the Spartans, 38-20, and Woolfolk rushed for 253 yards in 39 carries. After the game, Coach Bo Schembechler said: "I wondered what a kid like that would do if he ran as much as the guy on the West Coast (Marcus Allen). I didn't plan on this, but he proved he can do it. Butch is going to be our all-time leading ground gainer. There isn't any way they're going to stop him now. And so be it." His 1981 rushing performance against the Spartans still stands as the fifth best single-game performance by a Wolverine running back.

MVP of the 1981 Rose and Bluebonnet Bowls

Woolfolk was named the Most Valuable Player in both of Michigan's two bowl game appearances in 1981.  During the January 1981 Rose Bowl, he gained 182 yards against Washington, and during the December 1981 Bluebonnet Bowl, in which he gained 186 yards against UCLA. The hotel where the Wolverines team was staying was evacuated the night before the 1981 Rose Bowl game when a fire alarm was triggered at 2:30 a.m., and Woolfolk only had three hours of sleep that night.  He won the MVP award despite the lack of sleep, and after the game Woolfolk called the game his "greatest thrill in football."  Commenting on the MVP trophy, Woolfolk said: "If I could, I'd break this trophy into 95 pieces and hand it out to all the guys on the squad." After winning his second MVP trophy in 1981's Bluebonnet Bowl, Woolfolk said: "I might look back in later years and notice that, but right now all I can think about is that I've worn a Michigan uniform for the last time."

Woolfolk's top ten games at Michigan
Woolfolk's top ten games in a Michigan uniform are as follows:

Relationship with Bo Schembechler
During his four years at Michigan, Woolfolk had what one reporter described as "a strange love-hate relationship" with Coach Bo Schembechler. Woolfolk noted at the time Schembechler is a "tough coach", and it was "not easy at all" playing for him. Schembechler was often angered by Woolfolk's tendency to try to run around defenders rather than banging through them, resulting in Woolfolk being benched more than once. But Schembechler said Woolfolk "came of age" in the November 1980 Ohio State game. After Woolfolk's MVP performance in the 1981 Rose Bowl helped Schembechler to his first bowl game victory, Bo complimented Woolfolk's powerful performance, noting: "Butch can be a real load." By the 1981 season, Schembechler was a true believer in Woolfolk, saying: "Today, I can say without reservation, that I'd rather go into a big game with Woolfolk at tailback than any other back in the country." Woolfolk, too, concluded in the end that Schembechler was "key" to his success: "He kept after me. He kept saying I was getting too fancy. He kept saying, 'You're a big back, a fast back, and you ought to be running over people -- not trying to dance around them.'"

Track and field
While at Michigan, Woolfolk was also the 1980 Big Ten Conference track champion in the outdoor 200 meter and indoor 300 meter events. He also competed in the 200 meter event in the 1980 Olympic Trials.  Through the 2007 season his 1980 outdoor 200 meter time of 20.59 seconds remains the all-time University of Michigan record.  His 1980 outdoor 100 m time of 10.36, which is now the fourth fastest in Michigan history was once the school record, and his indoor 300 meter (event retired) time of 30.38, which is now the second fastest in Michigan history was also once a school record.  The 100 m record and 300 m record were broken by 4 × 100 m relay race teammate Andrew Bruce in 1981 and 1982 respectively.  The men's track and field team won the Big Ten indoor title in 1982, and they won the outdoor titles in 1980, 1981, 1982.  The 4 × 100 meter relay team won the Big Ten Conference championships in 1981 and 1982, and their 1980 and 1982 times of 3:06.95 and 3:07.34 with Woolfolk running second and Bruce running anchor are the 2nd  and 3rd fastest times in Michigan team history.  The 1980 relay time continues to be a Ferry Field stadium record.  Bruce and Woolfolk also are members of the Michigan team sprint medley record holding team (1982, 3:17.84).

NFL career
Woolfolk played three years in the NFL for the New York Giants (1982–1984), two years with the Houston Oilers (1985–1987), and two years with the Detroit Lions (1987–1988).  He was a versatile player who accumulated nearly 5,000 all-purpose yards and had seven 100-yard games, five as a receiver out of the backfield and two as a rusher.  Three of his 100-yard games came as a Giant and four as an Oiler.

Offers from agents
Woolfolk told the AP in 1982 of receiving offers of representation from some 50 agents while he was still in college. Woolfolk noted that he was offered under-the-table payments by agents while he was still in school, as well as cars, and even a job for his stepfather, William Johnson, a Newark dockworker. Woolfolk turned down those offers and signed with Jerry Argovitz.

New York Giants
Woolfolk was drafted by the Giants in the first round of the 1982 NFL Draft. Woolfolk, who had graduated from high school in New Jersey and was a Giants fan, recalled watching the draft at his apartment in Ann Arbor: "When there were only four or five choices left before the Giants picked, I was hoping I'd last."

In 1982, Woolfolk was named the NFC's Offensive Rookie of the Year, after appearing in all nine games of the strike-shortened NFL season, in which he rushed for 439 yards, caught 23 passes for 224 yards, and scored four touchdowns. In a December 1982 game against the Oilers, Woolfolk scored his first two NFL touchdowns, one rushing and one receiving, to help the Giants win, 17–14. With the Giants trailing and less than two minutes remaining in the game, Woolfolk scored on a 40–yard gain after making a leaping, one-handed catch. The next day, The New York Times published an article headlined, "The Catch By Woolfolk." The article concluded that with Woolfolk and Rob Carpenter, the Giants "have their best backfield combination since the glory years of Frank Gifford and Alex Webster a quarter of a century ago."  Over the course of the season his 1,091 all-purpose yards was third to only James Brooks (1,383) and Marcus Allen (1,098).

In 1983, Bill Parcells' first year as head coach, Woolfolk gained 1,225 yards from scrimmage for the Giants (857 yards rushing and 368 yards receiving) -- more yards than any Giants running back in the previous ten years.  He also set the NFL record for most rushing attempts in a game with 43 carries (for 159 yards) on November 20, 1983. Woolfolk gained 115 yards on 26 carries in the first half alone and said after the game: "I'm not as tired as I thought I would be when somebody told me how many carries I had." Ironically, Woolfolk's 43-carry record was broken in 1988 by Jamie Morris, the same player who also broke Woolfolk's career rushing record at the University of Michigan.

In 1984, Woolfolk was relegated to back-up status as Joe Morris took over the starting job at tailback midway through the season.  The 1984 Giants made the playoffs, but Woolfolk did not touch the ball. In March 1985, the Giants traded Woolfolk to the Oilers. In reporting on the trade, The New York Times said: "The mystery of Butch Woolfolk, who in his three seasons with the Giants went from star running back to benchwarmer may be solved next fall, but not with Giants." Woolfolk said at the time he was "not bitter" about the trade, and Coach Bill Parcells said: "Maybe a new place will be good for Butch.  I don't think he was satisfied with what transpired last year."

Houston Oilers
Playing for the Oilers during the 1985 NFL season, Woolfolk was fifth in the conference with 80 receptions for 814 yards. He also rushed for 392 yards and had 1,206 yards from scrimmage.  Woolfolk played three more seasons in the NFL with the Oilers and Lions from 1986–88 but rushed for fewer than 100 yards in each of those years.  With the Oilers, Mike Rozier was the leading rusher and Drew Hill was the leading receiver, but Woolfolk led the team's running backs in receiving yards in both 1985 and 1986.  In 1986, he switched from tailback to fullback,  but he only played in 10 games due to a fractured and dislocated shoulder in the second half of the season. The Oilers drafted Alonzo Highsmith with the third selection overall in the 1987 NFL Draft after trading up in the draft because their top three running backs Rozier, Ray Wallace and Woolfolk had finished the season on injured reserve. At Houston, Woolfolk was reunited with former Michigan teammate Stan Edwards.  The sons of both Woolfolk and Edwards (Braylon Edwards) would later follow in their fathers' footsteps by playing at Michigan.

Detroit Lions
Woolfolk was released by the Oilers at the beginning of training camp in 1987 and signed with the Lions.  Woolfolk appeared in 12 games for the 1987 Lions and contributed 549 yards of total offense–248 yards receiving, 219 yards on kick returns, and 82 yards rushing.  Woolfolk appeared in only three games for the Lions in 1988 and was limited to four yards rushing, four yards receiving and 99 yards on four kick returns.  He injured his knee in the season's third game, was out for the season, and did not make it back into an NFL lineup after the injury.

Career after football
Woolfolk worked for over 20 years in various real estate ventures. His real estate experience began in 1985 as an independent owner and operator of rental properties in Houston, while he was still playing for the Oilers. In 1992, as co-owner of New Choice Builders, Woolfolk began building affordable single-family housing in Houston's revitalized communities. In 1994, Woolfolk worked with Home Ownership Partners, Inc., to build affordable housing for residents of Fort Bend County, Texas, a suburban county outside of Houston. Woolfolk procured the largest HUD grant given at that time by Fort Bend County for affordable housing assistance. Starting in approximately 1995, Woolfolk worked for Intrepid Holdings, Inc. in Houston. At Intrepid, he developed residential lots for several large builders including US Home, Gateway Homes, Texas Colonial, and KB Home.

In June 2007, Forward Edge, Inc. announced that Woolfolk had joined the company as its new business developer. The company stated at the time that Woolfolk would help the company's development and implementation of steroid testing for Texas high school athletes. At the time, Woolfolk said: "There's a lot more to this than just passing a law. Kids are using steroids and they are doing so at dangerous levels. ... I've been there. I've watched it. Once you've watched it, you have more of a commitment to get the kids off of the steroids. It's not just a business for me. It's a passion of mine."  Woolfolk remains active in the Houston football community as a Houston Texans ambassador.  Various ambassadors sign autographs at locations throughout Reliant Stadium during games.

Family
Woolfolk and his wife, Regina, have two sons, Jarrel and Troy Woolfolk. Their son Troy Woolfolk was a defensive back at Michigan from 2007 to 2011.  When his son was issued a Michigan jersey with the Woolfolk name on the back, Butch Woolfolk said: "It's a big day, no doubt. I'm proud of him and excited for him. But the biggest thing for me is, I know he's at a place where I don't have to worry about him."

Statistics
Career

100-Yard Games
											

N.B.: Home team is in bold.

See also
Lists of Michigan Wolverines football rushing leaders

References

External links
 Bentley Library profile
 

1960 births
Living people
People from Kankakee, Illinois
People from Westfield, New Jersey
Sportspeople from Milwaukee
Sportspeople from Union County, New Jersey
Sportspeople from the Chicago metropolitan area
Players of American football from Houston
Players of American football from Milwaukee
Players of American football from Illinois
Players of American football from New Jersey
Track and field athletes from Houston
Track and field athletes from Milwaukee
American football return specialists
American football running backs
Westfield High School (New Jersey) alumni
Michigan Wolverines football players
Michigan Wolverines men's track and field athletes
New York Giants players
Houston Oilers players
Detroit Lions players